Leuctra is a town of ancient Boeotia, Greece.

Leuctra or Leuktra may also refer to:
Leuctra (Arcadia), a town of ancient Arcadia, Greece
Leuctra (Laconia), a town of ancient Laconia, Greece
Leuctra (insect), a genus of insect
Battle of Leuctra, 371 BCE, fought near the Boeotian Leuctra